"Wish I Could Fly" is a song by Swedish pop music duo Roxette, released on 1 February 1999 as the lead single from their sixth studio album, Have a Nice Day (1999). An orchestral pop ballad containing elements of electronica, the song was written as an experiment by Per Gessle, who was attempting to establish if a prominently-placed drum loop would fit alongside a large orchestra. The track became a sizable hit for the duo, peaking inside the top twenty of Billboards European Hot 100 Singles, and was the most-played song on European radio of 1999. It would also become their final top 40 hit on the UK Singles Chart.

Composition and style

"Wish I Could Fly" is an orchestral pop ballad which contains elements of electronica. According to the liner notes of the duo's 2002 compilation The Ballad Hits, the song was written by Per Gessle as an experiment to "see how a drum machine loop would fit with a big orchestra, but it quickly evolved into something more substantial." Vocalist Marie Fredriksson has described it as a "very special song to me. One of my all-time favourite Roxette songs. I never get tired of this." A Spanish-language version of the song, titled "Quisiera volar", was included as a bonus track on deluxe edition versions of Have a Nice Day.

According to Ultimate Guitar, "Wish I Could Fly" has a moderately slow tempo of 80 beats per minute. The song is composed around a complex, orchestra-performed chord progression, however, its basic chord structure consists of four repetitions of an A♯–F–Gm–A♯–C sequence during the introduction. Each verse is composed of four repetitions of a Gm–A♯–C sequence, followed by a chorus consisting of F–Dm–Gm–C–F–D♯–A♯–C. The bridge is made up of three progressions of G–C–G–D, followed by two short progressions of a Dm–F–G sequence, while the outro is based around three elongated bars of Cm–D♯–F.

Critical reception
Swedish newspaper Aftonbladet stated that the song "sounds modern but at the same time classic Roxette". AllMusic editor Jason Damas described it as "excellent pop" in his review of Have a Nice Day. Birmingham Evening Mail commented, "Marie Fredricksson and Per Gessle, once considered the hottest thing out of Sweden since ABBA and Volvo, are back with their first new release for four years. It's a simple song, a beautiful ballad with a big production, that's unmistakeably Roxette." Dagens Nyheter called it a "complete with Portishead loops and finger-in-the-air arrangement." Hege I. Hanssen from Norwegian newspaper Nordlys noted it as a "classic Roxette-song", while Brendon Veevers from Renowned for Sound said it is "classic Roxette balladry". Sunday Mirror commented, "Yes, the Swedish rock gods are back! With the same haircuts, the same sound and the same fans. A hit then."

Commercial performance
The song became a sizable hit for the duo, peaking within the top thirty of numerous record charts throughout Europe and ending 1999 as the most-played song on European radio. The single charted highest in Hungary, where it reached number one and in the duo's native Sweden, reaching number four; it was certified gold in the latter country for shipments in excess of 25,000, and it was also certified gold in Italy for shipments of 15,000 units. The single reached the top ten in Finland, Iceland and Italy, the top twenty in Belgium, Denmark, Norway and Switzerland, and the top thirty in Germany and the Netherlands. It peaked within the top twenty of Billboards European Hot 100 Singles.

Roxette performed the song at numerous high-profile events in the UK, including the annual televised Party in the Park concert at London's Hyde Park, and on BBC One's Top of the Pops. "Wish I Could Fly" peaked at number 11 on the UK Singles Chart, making it their highest-charting single in the country since "Almost Unreal" reached number seven in 1993, although it would also prove to be their final top forty hit in the UK. Similarly, the song peaked at number 11 on the singles charts of both Austria and Spain, also peaking at number one on the Spanish Airplay Chart. It became the duo's first single since "The Big L." in 1992 to enter the French Singles Chart, albeit spending six weeks on the chart and peaking at number 80.

While Have a Nice Day was not released in the United States, an updated and repackaged edition of their 1995 compilation Don't Bore Us, Get to the Chorus! Roxette's Greatest Hits was released there in September 2000 by Edel Records. This new edition of the compilation included "Wish I Could Fly" and subsequent single "Stars", with the former being serviced to adult contemporary radio formats from July 2000. The song went on to peak at number 27 on Billboards Adult Contemporary Chart, and at number forty on Adult Top 40.

Music video
The music video of the song was directed by long-time collaborator Jonas Åkerlund, and consists of a compilation of brief shots of different people's lives, prominently featuring Marie alone in her apartment yearning for a missed lover. Shots are sequenced through a moving spotlight that shines through the darkness, illuminating scenes of lovers sleeping or having sex, prostitutes, streets, buses and metro stations, as well as various inanimate objects. In one of those shots, we see Per with his one year old son Gabriel. The video was published on YouTube in November 2010. By November 2020, it has been viewed over 10,2 million times.

Formats and track listings
All songs written by Per Gessle.

 CD single (Australia · Europe 8865422 · Japan TOCP-40111)
 "Wish I Could Fly" – 4:40
 "Happy Together" – 3:55
 "Wish I Could Fly"  – 4:13

 Australian CD2 (8867942)
 "Wish I Could Fly" – 4:40
 "Happy Together" – 3:55
 "The Look" – 3:56
 "It Must Have Been Love" – 4:19
 "Joyride"  – 4:02

 UK cassette and CD1 (TCEM-537 · CDEMS-537)
 "Wish I Could Fly" – 4:40
 "Happy Together" – 3:55
 "Wish I Could Fly"  – 7:57

 UK CD2 (CDEM-537)
 "Wish I Could Fly"  – 4:02
 "Wish I Could Fly"  – 3:59
 "Wish I Could Fly"  – 4:32
 "Wish I Could Fly"  – 6:34

 European CD-maxi (8867532)
 "Wish I Could Fly"  – 4:02
 "Wish I Could Fly"  – 7:57
 "Wish I Could Fly"  – 4:32
 "Wish I Could Fly"  – 6:34

 12-inch single (8867536)
 "Wish I Could Fly"  – 7:57
 "Wish I Could Fly"  – 6:34
 "Wish I Could Fly"  – 6:10

Credits and personnel
Credits adapted from the liner notes of The Ballad Hits.

Studios
 Recorded at Polar Studios (Stockholm, Sweden) in January 1998 and at El Cortijo Studios (Marbella, Spain) in March 1998
 Mixed at Mono Music (Stockholm, Sweden)

Musicians
 Marie Fredriksson – lead and background vocals, production, mixing
 Per Gessle – background vocals, acoustic guitar, string arrangements, production, mixing
 Micke "Nord" Andersson – twelve string acoustic and Rickenbacker guitars
 Michael Ilbert – programming, engineering, string arrangements, production, mixing
 Jonas Isacsson – additional bass guitar
 Christer Jansson – tom-toms, cymbals
 Christoffer Lundquist – background vocals, extended-range bass
 Clarence Öfwerman – keyboards, programming, production, mixing
 Mats "MP" Persson – string arrangements
 Stockholms Nya Kammarorkester  – strings

Charts

Weekly charts

Year-end charts

Certifications

Release history

References

External links
 
 
 
 

Roxette songs
1999 singles
1999 songs
EMI Records singles
Music videos directed by Jonas Åkerlund
Number-one singles in Hungary
Pop ballads
Songs written by Per Gessle